The King of Hanover (German: König von Hannover) was the official title of the head of state and hereditary ruler of the Kingdom of Hanover, beginning with the proclamation of King George III of the United Kingdom, as "King of Hanover" during the Congress of Vienna, on 12 October 1814 at Vienna, and ending with the kingdom's annexation by Prussia on 20 September 1866.

History
King George III had ruled the Electorate of Hanover, with the title of Prince-elector, until Hanover was conquered by Napoleon in 1807. In 1813 George was restored to his Hanoverian territories, and in October 1814 they were constituted as the independent Kingdom of Hanover at the Congress of Vienna.

The personal union with the United Kingdom ended in 1837 on the accession of Queen Victoria because the succession laws in Hanover, based on Salic law, prevented a female inheriting the title if there was any surviving male heir (in the United Kingdom, a male took precedence only over his sisters).

List of Electors of Hanover

Ernest Augustus was appointed as the first Elector of Hanover in 1692, but he died in 1698 before the Imperial Diet confirmed the elevation of Hanover to the status of an Electorate in 1708. His widow, Sophia of Hanover, was still known as Electress of Hanover. Their son was George I.

List of Kings of Hanover

Standard and coat of arms
After the personal union with Great Britain ended in 1837, the monarchs of Hanover kept the British royal arms and standard, only introducing a new Crown (after the British model).

See also
 Kingdom of Hanover
 House of Hanover
 German Chancery

King

Hanover